Grace Luczak (Fattal) (born May 24, 1989 in Royal Oak, Michigan) is an American Olympic rower.

Life
Grace was a member of the USA Olympic rowing team in 2016. She has set two World Records, including the current record in the Women’s 8+ boat. She is a three-time World Champion and multiple World Cup medalist. She was recognized as one of the Top 10 Rowers in the world by World Rowing.

She began rowing at Pioneer High School in Michigan. From there, she attended Stanford University, 2011.  The women's rowing team won the NCAA Championship in 2009, with Grace in the winning Varsity 8+. In 2015 Luczak, Kristine O'Brien, Adrienne Martelli and Grace Latz took the gold medal in the coxless four at the 2015 World Rowing Championships.

She has qualified to represent the United States at the 2020 Summer Olympics. Grace married Dr. Michael Fattal in 2022.

References

External links
 
 
 

1989 births
Living people
American female rowers
Sportspeople from Royal Oak, Michigan
World Rowing Championships medalists for the United States
Olympic rowers of the United States
Rowers at the 2016 Summer Olympics
Rowers at the 2020 Summer Olympics

Stanford Cardinal women's rowers